The 1999 Dubai Tennis Championships was a men's tennis tournaments played on outdoor hard courts at the Aviation Club Tennis Centre in Dubai in the United Arab Emirates that were part of the World Series of the 1999 ATP Tour. The tournament was held from 8 February through 14 February 1999. Unseeded Jérôme Golmard won the singles title.

Finals

Singles

 Jérôme Golmard defeated  Nicolas Kiefer 6–4, 6–2
 It was Golmard's 1st singles title of his career.

Doubles

 Wayne Black /  Sandon Stolle defeated  David Adams /  John-Laffnie de Jager 4–6, 6–1, 6–4
 It was Black's 1st title of the year and the 1st of his career. It was Stolle's 1st title of the year and the 10th of his career.

References

External links
 Official website
 ATP tournament profile
 ITF tournament edition details

 
Dubai Tennis Championships
Dubai Tennis Championships